Phytoecia puncticollis is a species of beetle in the family Cerambycidae. It was described by Faldermann in 1837. It is known from Russia, Azerbaijan, Georgia, Iraq, Armenia, Turkey, Iran, and Turkmenistan. It feeds on Eryngium billardierei.

Varietas
 Phytoecia puncticollis var. parvomaculata Plavilstshikov, 1929
 Phytoecia puncticollis var. bimaculata Plavilstshikov, 1929
 Phytoecia puncticollis var. bistrimaculata Plavilstshikov, 1932
 Phytoecia puncticollis var. diversicollis Pic, 1917
 Phytoecia puncticollis var. escalerai Plavilstshikov, 1929
 Phytoecia puncticollis var. immaculata Plavilstshikov, 1929
 Phytoecia puncticollis var. heydeni Pic, 1952
 Phytoecia puncticollis var. ignatii Plavilstshikov, 1929
 Phytoecia puncticollis var. occipitalis Plavilstshikov, 1929
 Phytoecia puncticollis var. infrequens Plavilstshikov, 1929
 Phytoecia puncticollis var. mardiniensis Heyden, 1894
 Phytoecia puncticollis var. aladaghensis Reitter, 1906
 Phytoecia puncticollis var. nigrifrons Breuning, 1951
 Phytoecia puncticollis var. nigroscapus Breuning, 1951
 Phytoecia puncticollis var. octopunctata Pic, 1952
 Phytoecia puncticollis var. trimaculata Pic, 1917
 Phytoecia puncticollis var. persica Ganglbauer, 1883
 Phytoecia puncticollis var. quadrimaculata Plavilstshikov, 1932
 Phytoecia puncticollis var. verticeuninotata Pic, 1952
 Phytoecia puncticollis var. quinquepuncticollis Pic, 1952
 Phytoecia puncticollis var. similis Plavilstshikov, 1929
 Phytoecia puncticollis var. stygia Ganglbauer, 1883
 Phytoecia puncticollis var. transitora Breuning, 1951
 Phytoecia puncticollis var. quadripunctata Breuning, 1951
 Phytoecia puncticollis var. trinoticollis Pic, 1952
 Phytoecia puncticollis var. unicoloricollis Plavilstshikov, 1932
 Phytoecia puncticollis var. unisignata Plavilstshikov, 1932
 Phytoecia puncticollis var. subtypica Plavilstshikov, 1932
 Phytoecia puncticollis var. gamborensis Pic, 1917

References

Phytoecia
Beetles described in 1837